Khvoyaman-e Jadid (also Romanized as Khvoyaman-e Jadīd and Khowyaman-e Jadīd) is a village in Rahal Rural District, in the Central District of Khoy County, West Azerbaijan Province, Iran. At the 2006 census, its population was 112, in 26 families.

References 

Populated places in Khoy County